The 2008–09 season of the Norwegian Premier League, the highest volleyball league for men in Norway.

League table

Before the season started, Tromsø had been deducted four points and had 0–6 in sets.

References

Volleyball competitions in Norway
Volley
Volley
2009 in volleyball
2008 in volleyball